Swan Island was an American five-piece rock band from Portland, Oregon, United States. Their music was influenced by classic rock, new wave, progressive rock, and metal, as well as queercore bands from the Pacific Northwest.

The band was started in March 2004 by drummer Vincent Domini  (Menagerie/DJ Automaton) and guitarist Aubree Bernier-Clarke (Half-Seas-Over). They were soon joined by guitarist Torrence Stratton, vocalist Brisa Gonzalez, and bassist Bob E. Kendrick (Shemo and owner of 16 records). Swan Island performed with Sleater-Kinney, Mary Timony, LKN, The Gossip, Tracy and the Plastics, and others on the west coast. In the summer of 2006 they performed at the week-long Homo-A-Go-Go festival in Olympia, Washington. Many of the members of Swan Island have been involved with Rock and Roll Camp for Girls.

The band's records have been reviewed at Spin Magazine, AllMusic, and PopMatters.

Discography
Night Owl,  3"CD on 16 Records, 2005
The Centre Will Hold, LP on 16 Records / Holocene Music, September 2006

References

External links
Swan Island Official Site
Willamette Week, Best New Band 2006
Willamette Week, Swan Island Calling It Quits
Cary Clarke, "Our Town Could Be Your Life." The Portland Mercury, January 17, 2008
Mairead Case, "Riot Redux." City Pages Music, October 11, 2006

Musical groups from Portland, Oregon
All-female bands
Queercore groups
2004 establishments in Oregon
2008 disestablishments in Oregon
Musical groups established in 2004
Musical groups disestablished in 2008